Anthony Joseph Bevilacqua (June 17, 1923 – January 31, 2012) was an American cardinal of the Roman Catholic Church. He served as archbishop of the Archdiocese of Philadelphia in Pennsylvania from 1988 to 2003.  Bevilacqua previously served as bishop of the Diocese of Pittsburgh in Pennsylvania from 1983 to 1987 and as an auxiliary bishop of the Diocese of Brooklyn in New York City from 1980 to 1983. He was elevated as a cardinalate in 1991.

Biography

Early life and education
Anthony Bevilacqua was born on June 17, 1923, in Brooklyn, New York, to Luigi (1884–1961) and Maria (née Codella, 1893–1968) Bevilacqua. Luigi was born in Spinazzola, Italy and worked as a bricklayer. and Maria was born in Calitri, Italy. Anthony Bevilacqua had four brothers: Michael, Angelo, Rocco, and Frank; and six sisters, Josephine (died of meningitis at age two), Isabella, Virginia, Mary Jo, Gloria, and Madeline. Luigi immigrated to the United States in 1910, followed by Maria and their oldest son, Michael. The family lived in New Rochelle, New York; Hartford, Connecticut; and Brooklyn before settling in Woodhaven, Queens.  Luigi operated a hair dying shop and shoe shine shop in Queens

Anthony Bevilacqua attended Public School No. 60, St. Thomas the Apostle School, and Richmond Hill High School, all in the Borough of Queens. He then studied at Cathedral College in Queens, where he won prizes in mathematics and science.  He earned a trip to Washington, D.C. for an essay on the immaculate conception. Bevilacqua graduated from Cathedral College with a Bachelor of Arts degree in 1943, and then entered the Seminary of the Immaculate Conception in Huntington, New York.

Ordination and ministry

Bevilacqua was ordained to the priesthood for the Diocese of Brooklyn by Bishop Thomas Malloy on June 11, 1949, at St. James Cathedral in Brooklyn. He then served as an associate pastor at Sacred Heart of Jesus and St. Mary Parish in Brooklyn and St. Mary Parish on Long Island until 1950. Bevilacqua taught at Cathedral College from 1950 to 1954, and then entered the Pontifical Gregorian University in Rome.  He obtained a Doctor of Canon Law degree summa cum laude from the Gregorian in 1956.

After returning to Brooklyn, Bevilacqua served on the diocesan tribunal and as a chaplain to the Sisters of St. Joseph congregation in Brentwood, New York. He earned a Master of Political Science degree from Columbia University in 1962, and was named vice-chancellor of the diocese in 1965. From 1968 to 1980, Bevilacqua was a visiting professor of canon law at Seminary of the Immaculate Conception. During this time, he also founded the Diocesan Office for Migration and Refugees in 1971. Bevilacqua earned a J.D. from St. John's University in 1975. He was admitted to practice law in the courts of New York and Pennsylvania and before the U.S. Supreme Court.

Bevilacqua was named by the Holy See as honorary prelate of his holiness on January 23, 1976; he became chancellor of the diocese that year also. He remained chancellor of the diocese and director of its Migration and Refugee Office until 1983. From 1977 to 1980, Bevilacqua taught immigration law as an adjunct professor at St. John's University School of Law.

Auxiliary Bishop of Brooklyn
On October 7, 1980, Bevilacqua was appointed as an auxiliary bishop of the Diocese of Brooklyn, and titular bishop of Aquae Albae in Byzacena by Pope John Paul II. He received his episcopal consecration on November 24, 1980 from Bishop Francis Mugavero, with Bishops John J. Snyder and Charles Mulrooney serving as co-consecrators, at the Basilica of Our Lady of Perpetual Help in Brooklyn.  Bevilacqua selected as his episcopal motto: Ecclesia Mater Nostra, meaning, "The Church, our Mother."

Mansour controversy 
In 1983, Bevilacqua became involved in the case of Agnes Mary Mansour.  A member of the Sisters of Mercy religious order in Detroit, Mansour administered the State of Michigan's Medicaid program as the director of the Michigan Department of Social Services.  In 1983, Detroit Archbishop Edmund Szoka asked Mansour to declare her opposition to public financing of abortion procedures for women, which she refused to do. The Vatican then sent Bevilacqua to meet with her. He told Mansour that if she didn't resign as director, she would have to leave the Sisters of Mercy. Mansour chose to keep her job and leave her religious order.

In the early 1980's, as chair of the Committee on Canonical Affairs, Bevilacqua led the US Conference of Catholic Bishops (USCCB) through the first phases of implementing the new 1983 Code of Canon Law, making appropriate U.S. adaptations.

Bishop of Pittsburgh
Bevilacqua was named by Pope John Paul II as the tenth bishop of the Diocese of Pittsburgh on October 7, 1983. Succeeding Bishop Vincent Leonard, Bevilacqua was consecrated by Bishop Mugavero on December 12, 1983. He was a member of the 1987 World Synod of Bishops on the role of laity in the church and the world.

O'Connor abuse case 
In 1985, John O'Connor, a priest of the Diocese of Camden in New Jersey, was charged with inappropriately touching a 14-year-old boy in that diocese during a sleepover. O'Connor was arrested, then released to a pretrial intervention program in Toronto, followed by a period of court supervision. After O'Connor's completion of the program, Camden Bishop George Guilfoyle asked Bevilacqua to accept O'Connor in the Diocese of Pittsburgh. Bevilacqua agreed and assigned O'Connor as a hospital chaplain. O'Connor was moved back to the Diocese of Camden in 1993 because his 1984 Cape May County victim had sued and received a settlement.

Karabin abuse case 
On August 14, 2018, Pennsylvania attorney general Josh Shapiro released a grand jury report detailing alleged sex abuse in six Pennsylvania dioceses, including the Diocese of Pittsburgh. The report showed a 1985 memo written by Bevilacqua in which he rejected a request to reassign Joseph D. Karabin, a diocese priest after two children told the diocese he had sexually molested them. Bevilacqua did not report Karabin to the police, but sent him instead to a treatment center for alcohol abuse in Maryland.  Karabin was kept on restricted assignments until 2002, when he was appointed as chaplain at a retirement home. Bishop Donald Wuerl. Bevilacqua's successor as bishop, withdrew Karabin's appointment and suspended his priestly faculties.

In 1986, Bevilacqua banned women from participating in the Holy Thursday foot-washing service.  He said that the service was a re-enactment of the Last Supper, in which Jesus only washed men's feet. After pushback from Catholic women and from the National Conference of Catholic Bishops, Bevilacqua relented, allowing individual pastors to decide. However, he refused to attend services that washed women's feet.

Archbishop of Philadelphia
John Paul II appointed Bevilacqua as archbishop of the Archdiocese of Philadelphia on December 8, 1987. Succeeding Cardinal John Krol, Bevilacqua was installed on February 11, 1988.  John Paul II created Bevilacqua as cardinal-priest of Ss. Redentore e S. Alfonso in Via Merulana in the consistory of June 28, 1991.

In 1998, Bevilacqua asked Pennsylvania Governor Tom Ridge to fund food stamp assistance for immigrants and instituted service centers for Latino and African American Catholics.

Bevilacqua is remembered for his frequent visits to churches in the diocese, his knowledge of fiscal matters, his conservatism, and his closing of schools. Organizationally, he divided the archdiocese into six vicariates, each with a general vicariate, and subdivided the central administration into six secretariats. He hosted a weekly radio call-in program, Live with Cardinal Bevilacqua, which aired on WZZD-AM in Philadelphia. In 2002, he was named to the PoliticsPA "Power 50" list of politically influential personalities.

Within the USCCB, Bevilacqua served as chair of the Committee on Migration from 1983 to 1984, during which time he visited the refugee camps of Southeast Asia and Africa. He also chaired the Committee for Canonical Affairs (1981–1984) and the Committee on Pro-Life Activities.  In 2005, the Philadelphia District Attorney's office issued a report that criticized Bevilacqua and his predecessor, Cardinal Krol, for failing to protect children in the archdiocese from sexual abuse by priests.

Retirement and death
Upon reaching the mandatory retirement age of 75 in June 1998, Bevilacqua submitted his letter of resignation to John Paul II, who allowed him to continue in his post.  Bevilacqua lost the right to participate in a papal conclave when he reached the age of 80 in June 2003. His resignation was finally accepted by the Pope on July 15, 2003, Bevilacqua served as apostolic administrator of the archdiocese until the installation of his successor, Cardinal Justin Rigali, on October 7, 2003.  In retirement, Bevilacqua lived at his home on the grounds of St. Charles Borromeo Seminary in Wynnewood, Pennsylvania.

In February 2011 it was reported that Bevilacqua was suffering from cancer and dementia. In November, 2011,  Bevilacqua gave a seven-hour deposition in a sealed hearing on the handling of sexual abuse cases in the archdiocese. Due to his declining health, his testimony was videotaped. Defense lawyers said the cardinal could no longer recognize the priest who had been his longtime aide.

Anthony Bevilacqua died suddenly on January 31, 2012, at age 88 in his home in Wynnewood.

Lynn negligence case 
In 2012, Monsignor William Lynn, former secretary for clergy in the Archdiocese of Philadelphia, was convicted of one count of child endangerment. This conviction resulted from his negligent oversight of Edward Avery, a priest in the archdiocese, who sexually fondled a 12-year-old boy. Lynn was acquitted of conspiracy and a second child endangerment count. Lynn's lawyers had argued that the case should be thrown out. They presented a 1994 memo that showed that Lynn had prepared a list of 35 abuse allegations against priests in the archdiocese. Bevilacqua had ordered Monsignor James Molloy to destroy the list.

Picard retaliation 
During Lynn's trial, it was revealed that in 1996, Monsignor Michael Picard, an archdiocesan pastor at St. Andrew Parish in Newtown, Pennsylvania, had expressed concerns to Bevilacqua regarding a priest assigned to his parish.  That unnamed priest had been accused of sexually assaulting a minor in 1982. In response, Bevilacqua ordered Picard to apologize to the priest and spend two weeks on a contemplative retreat. The other priest was transferred to another parish. In response to his allegation, the archdiocese said it had received no complaints about the accused priest's work in 15 years of service to three parishes. That priest died in 2006.

Bevilacqua abuse allegation 
In September 2018, the Diocese of Pittsburgh was sued by Heather Taylor, a former student at St. Gabriel of the Sorrowful Virgin School near Pittsburgh.  Taylor claimed that Bevilacqua, then bishop of Pittsburgh, had groped her while visiting St. Garbriel.  She also accused two other priests on the school faculty of molesting, both of whom were found to have sexually abused minors.

Viewpoints 
In 2000, Bevilacqua testified before the Pennsylvania General Assembly in support of a bill that would enact a moratorium on capital punishment in that state. Bevilacqua was a frequent critic of LGBT rights, called it an "...aberration, moral evil...".  He also believed that gay men should not be accepted as Catholic priests.

In 2004, Bevilacqua praised the banning of abortion services for women in US military hospitals by an act of Congress. In 2009, Bevilacqua joined other American bishops in condemning the University of Notre Dame for inviting President Barack Obama to be its commencement speaker.  This was due to Obama's support for abortion rights for women. Bevilacqua commented:It is my hope and prayer that the University of Notre Dame will rescind the invitation to President Obama to speak at the commencement and withhold the conferral of an honorary degree to him or to anyone who so blatantly disregards the basic moral principles upon which the United States of America was founded.

References

Sources

External links
 Curriculum vitae in The Daily Catholic
 Roman Catholic Diocese of Pittsburgh History of Bishops webpage
 "Catholic Church Priests Raped Children in Philadelphia, But the Wrong People Went to Jail": ''Newsweek

1923 births
2012 deaths
21st-century American cardinals
20th-century American cardinals
Pontifical Gregorian University alumni
American people of Italian descent
Roman Catholic archbishops of Philadelphia
Cardinals created by Pope John Paul II
Columbia Graduate School of Arts and Sciences alumni
Roman Catholic bishops of Pittsburgh
St. John's University School of Law alumni
People from Brooklyn
Religious leaders from New Rochelle, New York
Catholics from New York (state)
People from Woodhaven, Queens